Nils Norberg is a heavy metal guitarist from Umeå in northern Sweden.
He played in the band Nocturnal Rites from 1996-2008. His playing can be heard on the albums Tales of Mystery and Imagination, The Sacred Talisman, Afterlife, Shadowland, New World Messiah, Grand Illusion, and The 8th Sin.  In 2008, he left the band, stating his musical interest had "cooled down".

He is an endorsee of Caparison guitars, using 7-string guitars based on the Dellinger model.

Norberg has also performed on DVDs from Young Guitar Magazine, notably the track "Lick Me".

References

External links 
 Guitar Demonstration
 Guitar Demonstration
 Guitar Demonstration
 Guitar Demonstration
 "Lick Me" from Young Guitar Magazine
  Message explaining leaving Nocturnal Rites, originally posted on the band's homepage

Swedish heavy metal guitarists
Lead guitarists
Seven-string guitarists